John Grenville (by 1506–62 or later), of Exeter, Devon, was an English Member of Parliament.

He was a Member (MP) of the Parliament of England for Exeter in 1545, November 1554 and 1558.

References

Year of birth missing
1562 deaths
English MPs 1558
Members of the Parliament of England (pre-1707) for Exeter

Members of the Parliament of England (pre-1707)
English MPs 1545–1547
English MPs 1554